Martín Zapata (28 October 1970 – 22 April 2006) was a Colombian footballer who played as a midfielder.

He played for Once Caldas from 1992 to 1995, Deportivo Cali from 1995 to 1999, Club Sport Emelec in 2000 and Deportivo Cali again in 2001. He was the top scorer of the 1999 Copa Libertadores, in which Cali finished runner-up to Palmeiras, and Zapata missed his penalty.

He was capped 5 times for Colombia national football team, all at the 2000 CONCACAF Gold Cup, and was also a squad member for the 1997 Copa América.

He was murdered in Cali on 22 April 2006.

Titles

Deportivo Cali 

 1998 Torneo Finalizacion

References

External links

1970 births
2006 deaths
Association football midfielders
Colombian footballers
Colombia international footballers
1997 Copa América players
Once Caldas footballers
Deportivo Cali footballers
C.S. Emelec footballers
Colombian expatriate footballers
Expatriate footballers in Ecuador
Colombian expatriates in Ecuador
Colombian murder victims
Deaths by firearm in Colombia
Male murder victims
People murdered in Colombia
Sportspeople from Cauca Department
Footballers at the 1995 Pan American Games
Pan American Games bronze medalists for Colombia
Pan American Games medalists in football
Medalists at the 1995 Pan American Games
20th-century Colombian people